Vicentinópolis is a municipality in south Goiás state, Brazil.  The population was 8,873 inhabitants in 2020 in a total area of 737.2 km2.

Location
Vicentinópolis is located in the Meia Ponte Microregion, 22 kilometers west of Joviânia and 65 kilometers south of Edéia.  The distance to the state capital, Goiânia, is 176 km.  Highway connections are made by BR-060 / Abadia de Goiás / Guapó / Indiara / GO-320 / Edéia. For a list of distances see Sepin

Neighboring municipalities are:
north:  Edéia
south:  Porteirão and Goiatuba
east:  Joviânia and Pontalina
west:  Edéia

Vicentinópolis began as a district of Pontalina in 1964, separating in 1980.

Demographics
Population density: 8.03 inhabitants/km2 (2007)
Urban population: 5,189 (2007)
Rural population: 730 (2007)
Population growth:  -0.23% from 2000/2007

The economy
The economy is based on subsistence agriculture, cattle raising, services, public administration, and small transformation industries.
Industrial units: 4 (2007)
Commercial units: 97 (2007)
Financial institutions: - Banco do Brasil S.A. - Banco Itaú S.A. (01/06/2005)
Cattle herd: 34,545 head (6,660 milk cows) (2006)
Main crops: rice, beans, manioc, corn, sorghum, wheat, tomatoes, and soybeans (38,500 hectares).
Farms: 194
Area of farms: 65,224
Area of crops: 377 ha.
Area of pasture: 30,833 ha.
Farms with tractors: 101

Education (2006)
Schools: 4 with 1,881 students
Higher education: campus of the Universidade Estadual de Goiás
Adult literacy rate: 84.1% (2000) (national average was 86.4%)

Health (2007)
Hospitals: 2
Hospital beds: 32
Ambulatory clinics: 2
Infant mortality rate: 14.96 (2000) (national average was 33.0).

The municipality achieved a score of 0.773 on the United Nations Human Development Index, placing it in 37th place out of 242 municipalities in the state of Goiás. (2000) For the complete list see Frigoletto.com

See also
List of municipalities in Goiás

References

Frigoletto
 Sepin

Municipalities in Goiás